Events in the year 1811 in Portugal.

Incumbents
Monarch: Mary I

Events
11 March – Battle of Pombal
12 March Battle of Redinha
14 March – Battle of Casal Novo
25 March – Battle of Campo Maior
3 April – Battle of Sabugal
14 April–10 May – Blockade of Almeida

Arts and entertainment

Sports

Births

27 January – João Crisóstomo de Abreu e Sousa, prime minister (died 1895)

4 June – Antonia Ferreira, businesswoman, known for leadership in the cultivation of port wine and for winemaking innovations (d. 1896).

Deaths

References

 
1810s in Portugal
Years of the 19th century in Portugal